Mayonnaise is the debut album of the Filipino alternative rock band, Mayonnaise. The album was released in November 2004, under VAMP records, an independent music label. It was manufactured and distributed nationwide in the Philippines by Sony Music.

Tracks of the album were all recorded at Wombworks Studios, owned by ace Razorback bassist Louie Talan. All songs were produced by Rommel Sanchez, accompanied by Kevin Roy (of Razorback) for vocal supervision. Mastering of the album was done in Tracks Studios in Pasig, by Angee Rozul.

In November 21, 2019, the band released a remastered version of the album to commemorate its 15th anniversary titled Mayonnaise - (15th Anniversary Remaster).

In 2022, their 2004 hit song "Jopay "became popular for the second time because of Tiktok. A certain Tiktok video which was inspired by the 2022 Movie "Ngayon Kaya" entitled "Greatest What If", made a trend in the social media.
Jopay peaked Top 10 in Spotify Top 50 Philippines and it reached even the Gen Z and Gen Alpha. Jopay is also the most requested song in 2022 whenever other bands or singers have gigs or busking.

Track listing 
All songs were written by Monty Macalino except for tracks 9 and 10, which were written by Monty Macalino and Martin Rebong.

 "The Only Thing"
 "Tulog"
 "Bakit Part 1"
 "Punk You"
 "Jopay"
 "Pink White Blue"
 "Dahil"
 "Eddie Song"
 "Home"
 "Pseudo"
 "Bakit Part 2"
 "Aircon"

2004 debut albums